Baraisa (PC 212214) is a village in Manjhanpur Tehsil of  Kaushambi district of Uttar Pradesh

'Ashok Kumar Dwivedi' Aka 'Babbu Karvariya' is a well known personality in baraisa who was the Zamindar of the village at the time of Zamindari System. Also after the end of zamindari system their impact among the people remain the same and they are still solving the people's issues of the village.

In Baraisa the temple of lord Hanuman is very popular among the people of baraisa.

Baraisa come under the Manjhanpur Tehsil and the MLA of Manjhanpur is of BJP, Lal Bahadur.

Demographics 
As per Population Census 2011  Barasia had a population of 2689 out of which 1432 were males while 1257 were females. Population of children below 6 years of age is around 452 (16.81% of the total population). Average sex ratio for Barasia is 878 which is way lower than the state average of 912. Sex ratio for children below 6 years of age is at 773 in contrast to the state average being at 902. Literacy rate of Baraisa as per 2011 census stands at 65.27% (Males – 72.22 and Females – 57.55) compared to 67.68% of Uttar Pradesh. 48% of people living in Barasia belong to Schedule Caste.

People of Baraisa 
The people of baraisa are totally following Hinduism.They speaks , Hindi, Urdu, Bhojpuri and a little bit Avadhi.

Economy 
Agriculture is the main source of income and employment for the people.

References

Villages in Kaushambi district